The State Of Reason Mystery, a science fiction conspiracy novel series by Miles A. Maxwell,
tells the story of step-brothers Franklin Reveal, a Congregational minister, and Everon Student, an industrialist, after New York City is hit by an atomic bomb.

Releases to date in the mystery-thriller series include the novels Loss Of Reason, Search For Reason, and Finding Reason.

The main themes of the novels are the validity of religious belief, the value of philosophy, property rights and the value of government.

Die By The Pen, a novel that ties tangentially into the State Of Reason Mystery series, was released by Maxwell on May 1, 2016. The novel features FBI Agent Naomi Soul, who is to play an important role helping the brothers and journalist Victoria Hill investigate who destroyed New York in Book Three of the mystery series, Finding Reason. In Die By The Pen Naomi investigates the deaths of famous authors killed using the methods in their stories.

Drone, a prequel to the State Of Reason Mystery series, was released by Maxwell on June 22, 2016. The new short story features a terrorist who creates a constitutional crisis related to the U.S. Presidential election and the taking of office in the series by President Christopher Wall.

Vibrate, a novel that ties tangentially into the State Of Reason Mystery series, was released by Maxwell on July 29, 2019. The novel continues the story of now former FBI Agent Naomi Soul, who has become a private detective in New York City investigating the mysterious deaths of Manhattan multi-millionaires who seem to be dying from natural causes, but all from the same symptoms.

The Haunted House was released by Maxwell on Oct 19, 2022. The short story follows one of the "Reasoners", Phil Loonan, as he begins his career at age 15 by making the most of an opportunity that occurs as the result of a terrible personal loss.

References

External links 
Miles A Maxwell's State Of Reason website
Booktastic Interview

Book series introduced in 2015
2015 American novels
2015 science fiction novels
2016 American novels
2016 science fiction novels
2018 American novels
2018 science fiction novels
2019 American novels
2019 science fiction novels
2022 American novels
American science fiction novels
Dystopian novels